Ralph Theodore Breyer (February 23, 1904 – May 8, 1991) was an American competition swimmer and Olympic champion.  Breyer represented the United States at the 1924 Summer Olympics in Paris.  He won a gold medal as a member of the first-place record breaking U.S. team in the men's 4×200-meter freestyle relay event.  He also competed in the qualifying heats of the men's 400-meter freestyle, and recorded a time of 5:22.4 setting a new Olympic record.  The relay team consisted of members Harry Glancy, Wally O'Connor, Johnny Weissmuller, Dick Howell and Ralph Breyer, while other members of the US team included brothers Sam and Duke Kahanamoku. Breyer attended Northwestern University and led his team to two NCAA and three Big Ten championships. Individually, he earned four NCAA championships. His team remained undefeated in dual meets.  In 1925 he was the recipient of the Big Ten medal of honor. Breyer married Marguerite Gullicksen of Chicago, Illinois and had two children, William Charles Breyer and Robert Theodore Breyer. In March 1985, he was among the first athletes inducted into the NU Wildcats Hall of Fame.

See also
 List of Northwestern University alumni
 List of Olympic medalists in swimming (men)
 World record progression 4 × 200 metres freestyle relay

References

External links
 
 Ralph Breyer – Olympic athlete profile at Sports-Reference.com

1904 births
1991 deaths
American male freestyle swimmers
World record setters in swimming
Northwestern Wildcats men's swimmers
Olympic gold medalists for the United States in swimming
Swimmers from Chicago
Swimmers at the 1924 Summer Olympics
Medalists at the 1924 Summer Olympics
20th-century American people